The Practice of Love is the seventh studio album by Norwegian musician Jenny Hval, released 13 September 2019 on Sacred Bones Records. The album was produced by Hval, with co-production by Lasse Marhaug and features guest vocals from Vivian Wang, formerly of the psych rock band The Observatory, Australian singer-songwriter Laura Jean, and French experimental musician Félicia Atkinson.

The album's title was partially inspired by Valie Export's 1985 film of the same name.

Recording
The Practice of Love was written, performed, arranged and recorded in Oslo. Vivian Wang recorded in her bedroom, on her bed, in Singapore following brain surgery. Laura Jean Englert recorded in Sydney. Félicia Atkinson recorded at home between summer and fall 2018 with "little I".

Writing and composition
The album was written and produced by Hval after she completed writing a novel, titled Girls Against God, which was released in October 2020. The album was inspired by 1990s trance music and has been described as more accessible than Hval's previous work. In an interview for The Ringer, Hval explained, "I wanted to have some kind of clarity in the sound, not to make things muddy and deep, but to have things very light and clear, almost like the element of the transcendental in trance. It's sort of an elevated state, a very receptive state, I find. I can write things that wouldn't happen with other sounds."

Critical reception

At Metacritic, which assigns a normalized rating out of 100 to reviews from mainstream publications, The Practice of Love received an average score of 84, based on 16 reviews, indicating "universal acclaim".

Heather Phares of AllMusic gave the album a favourable review, writing, "It may be her subtlest, most approachable album yet; though its ideas are just as complex and provocative as those of Blood Bitch or Apocalypse, girl, there's something welcoming about it that engages the hearts and minds of her listeners fully."

Track listing

Personnel
Credits adapted from the liner notes of The Practice of Love.
Jenny Hval – vocals, background vocals, composer, arranger, instruments, production, programming (all tracks), concept, recording
Lasse Marhaug – co-production, mixing (track 8), recording (additional tracks), electronics, art direction
Laura Jean Englert – additional lyrics, vocals, voice (tracks 3, 4, 5), recording
Vivian Wang – vocals (tracks 1, 4, 5, 8), recording
Félicia Atkinson – vocals (tracks 3, 5, 8), recording
Anja Lauvdal – synths (tracks 1, 2)
Espen Reinertsen – saxophone (tracks 2, 3, 6)
Chris Elms – mixing (tracks 1–3, 5–7)
Kyrre Laastad – mixing (track 4)
Heba Kadry – mastering
Esra Røise – artwork

References

2019 albums
Jenny Hval albums
Sacred Bones Records albums